Brian Campbell may refer to:

Brian Campbell (born 1979), Canadian professional ice hockey defenceman
Brian Campbell (game designer), American game developer
Brian Campbell (rugby league), played for Ellerslie during the 1958 New Zealand rugby league season
Brian Campbell, co-writer of the 2001 film H3
Brian Campbell, killed December 4, 1983 while unarmed by the British Army, see Chronology of Provisional Irish Republican Army actions (1980–89)
Brian Campbell, see Candidates of the Victorian state election, 2006
 Brian Campbell (golfer) (born 1993), American golfer 
Brian Campbell (journalist), co-host of Morning Kombat at CBS Sports.

See also
Bryan Campbell (born 1944), Canadian former professional ice hockey centre